
Gmina Trzebiechów is a rural gmina (administrative district) in Zielona Góra County, Lubusz Voivodeship, in western Poland.

Villages
Gmina Trzebiechów contains the villages and settlements of Borek, Gębice, Głęboka, Głuchów, Ledno, Mieszkowo, Ostrzyce, Podlegórz, Radowice, Sadowo, Swarzynice and Trzebiechów.

Neighbouring gminas
Gmina Trzebiechów is bordered by the gminas of Bojadła, Kargowa, Sulechów, Zabór and Zielona Góra.

Twin towns – sister cities

Gmina Trzebiechów is twinned with:
 Schenkendöbern, Germany

References

Trzebiechow
Zielona Góra County